Augusto Licata (Rome, August 31, 1851- Naples, 1942) was an Italian painter, of Realist  portraits and genre subjects.

Biography
He was the first-born son of the painters Antonio Licata and his wife Orsola Faccioli, born during his father's sojourn in Rome. He studied in the Neapolitan Institute of Fine Arts under Domenico Morelli. Augusto's father had been linked with the institute. Augusto was named in 1902 honorary professor of Design for poster work at the institute.

Among his works are: Opera pia; Head of prete; Head of giovane; Napoletanina; Contadinella; Pagine d'Album; and Popolana.

References

19th-century Italian painters
Italian male painters
20th-century Italian painters
1851 births
1942 deaths
Painters from Naples
Italian genre painters
19th-century Italian male artists
20th-century Italian male artists